Susanna Jacoba 'Santjie' Steyn (born 20 June 1972) is a South African lawn bowler.

Bowls career
In 2011 she won the fours silver medal and triples bronze at the Atlantic Bowls Championships.

She competed in the women's fours and the women's triples events at the 2014 Commonwealth Games where she won a gold and bronze medal respectively.

She was selected as part of the South Africa team for the 2018 Commonwealth Games on the Gold Coast in Queensland.

References

1972 births
Living people
Bowls players at the 2010 Commonwealth Games
Bowls players at the 2014 Commonwealth Games
Commonwealth Games gold medallists for South Africa
Commonwealth Games bronze medallists for South Africa
South African female bowls players
Commonwealth Games medallists in lawn bowls
Medallists at the 2010 Commonwealth Games
Medallists at the 2014 Commonwealth Games